China's vast and diverse landscape is home to a profound variety and abundance of wildlife. As of one of 17 megadiverse countries in the world, China has, according to one measure, 7,516 species of vertebrates including 4,936 fish, 1,269 bird, 562 mammal, 403 reptile and 346 amphibian species. In terms of the number of species, China ranks third in the world in mammals, eighth in birds, seventh in reptiles and seventh in amphibians.

Many species of animals are endemic to China, including the country's most famous wildlife species, the giant panda. In all, about one-sixth of mammal species and two-thirds of amphibian species in China are endemic to the country.

Wildlife in China share habitat with and bear acute pressure from the world's largest population of humans. At least 840 species are threatened, vulnerable or in danger of local extinction in China, due mainly to human activity such as habitat destruction, pollution and poaching for food, fur and ingredients for traditional Chinese medicine.

Mammals

Primates
China is home to 21 primate species including gibbons, macaques, leaf monkeys, gray langurs, snub-nosed monkeys and lorises.  Most of China's primate species are endangered. Both apes and monkeys, particularly gibbons and macaques are prominently featured in Chinese culture, folk religion, art and literature. Monkey is one of the 12 animals of the Chinese zodiac. 

The only apes native to China are the gibbons. Gibbons are tree-dwellers, using their long arms to swing from branches. Gibbons can be recognized by their loud calls, with mating pairs often singing together as a duet.

The Hainan black crested gibbon is among the rarest and most endangered apes.  Endemic to the island of Hainan, there are fewer than 30 individuals left in the Bawangling National Nature Reserve. Like many other gibbons, male Hainan black crested gibbons are black in color while females are golden brown.  The eastern black crested gibbon is nearly as rare with only 20 or so in the Guangxi Zhuang Autonomous Region along with 30 in neighboring Vietnam.  About 99% of this ape's habitat in China has been lost.

The black crested gibbon is found across a greater swath of southwestern China.  The Yunnan lar gibbon, a subspecies of the lar or white-handed gibbon, might be extinct in China.  The animal was last observed by zoologists in 1988 and its call was last heard by locals in 2002.  A survey in November 2007 in the Nangunhe National Nature Reserve yielded no sign of this gibbon.

The northern white-cheeked gibbon is nearly extinct in the wilderness of southern Yunnan where they are hunted by local people as charms of good luck and for their bones which are made into weaving instrument and chopsticks.  As of 2008, a captive population of eight northern white-cheeked gibbons was living in the Mengyang Nature Reserve. Two of the individuals were released into the wild but still relied on tourists for food.  The eastern hoolock gibbon, which are distinguished by white tufts of hair above the eyebrows, are found in western Yunnan, along the border with Myanmar.  The western hoolock gibbon might be found in southeastern Tibet.  All gibbons in China are Class I protected species.

The most commonly found primates in China are macaques, which have oversized cheeks to store food and live in large troops.  The range of the rhesus or common macaque extends from as far north as the Taihang Mountains of Shanxi and down to Hainan. Tibetan macaques are often seen at tourist sites such as Mount Emei and Huangshan. Stump-tailed macaques have distinct red faces and live throughout southern China.  The Formosan rock macaque is endemic to Taiwan. Assam macaques are found in higher elevation areas of southern Tibet and the Southwest, and the northern pig-tailed macaque in Yunnan.
Macaques are Class I protected species in China but their numbers have fallen sharply. Monkey brain is a delicacy in parts of Guangxi and Guangdong, and macaques are often hunted for food.  The Monpa and Lhoba people of southern Tibet eat Assam macaques.  From 1998 to 2004, the number of rhesus macaques in China fell from 254,000 to about 77,000.  Over the same period, the Tibetan macaque population fell by 83% from about 100,000 to only about 17,000.

Snub-nosed monkeys are so named because they have only nostrils and virtually no nose.  Four of the five species in the world are found in China, including three that are endemic.  All live in mountainous forests at elevations of 1,500–3,400 m above sea level.  The golden snub-nosed monkey is most famous and most widely distributed, with subspecies in Sichuan, Hubei and Shaanxi.  The gray snub-nosed monkey is the most endangered, with about 700 individuals, found only in Guizhou.  The black snub-nosed monkey has about 1,700 individuals living in 17 identified groups in Yunnan and eastern Tibet. A small population of Myanmar snub-nosed monkey was found in western Yunnan in 2011.

Other Old World monkeys in China include the François' langur, white-headed langur, Phayre's leaf monkey, capped langur and Shortridge's langur, which are collectively categorized as lutungs and the Nepal gray langur, which is considered a true langur.  All of these species are endangered.  Lutungs, also called leaf monkeys, have relatively short arms, longer legs and long tails along with a hood of hair above their eyes.

François' langur is found only in southwest China and northern Vietnam.  The range of the white-headed langur is much smaller—only in southern Guangxi and Cát Bà Island in Vietnam.  Phayre's leaf monkey is native to Yunnan and a larger swath of Indochina.  The capped and Shortridge's langurs live along the Yunnan-Myanmar border.  The Nepal gray langur is larger than the lutungs and found in southern Tibet.

Whereas apes and monkeys are grouped as haplorhine or "dry nose" primates, lorises are strepsirrhine or "wet nose" primates. Lorises have big eyes, tiny ears, live in trees and are active at night. The pygmy slow loris and Bengal slow loris are both found in southern Yunnan and Guangxi and are Class I protected species.

Carnivores

Cats

China's big cat species include the tiger, leopard, snow leopard and clouded leopard.
The tiger is one of the 12 animals of the Chinese zodiac, and figures prominently in Chinese culture and history. Tiger bones are used in traditional Chinese medicine and tiger fur is used for decoration. The animal is vulnerable to poaching and habitat loss. Four tiger populations were native to China. All are critically endangered, protected and live in nature reserves.

The Siberian tiger occurs in the Northeast, along the border with Russia and North Korea. The Caspian tiger was last seen in the Manasi River Basin of the Xinjiang Uyghur Autonomous Region in the 1960s, where this population is now extinct. The South China tiger is an endemic population whose habitat is now confined to the mountain regions of Jiangxi, Hunan, Guangdong and Fujian. A few Indochinese tigers were known to live in Yunnan where six nature reserves have been established for their protection.

Three leopard subspecies are thought to occur in China: 
Leopards recorded in Qomolangma National Nature Preserve in southern Tibet are subsumed to the Indian leopard.
The Indochinese leopard occurs in Yunnan Province of southern China, where the Pearl River is thought to form a barrier to leopard populations farther north. Camera-trap surveys conducted between 2002 and 2009 in 11 nature reserves in southern China recorded leopards only in Changqing National Nature Reserve in the Qinling Mountains, but not in Sichuan's Wolong Nature Reserve and other protected areas in Sichuan.
The Amur leopard is native to northern China including the Jilin province along the border with Russia and North Korea, where it has been recorded by camera-traps in Hunchun National Nature Reserve. Leopards cross between China, Russia and North Korea across the Tumen River despite a high and long wire fence marking the international boundary. Contemporary records of leopards exist from protected areas in Hebei, Henan and Shanxi Provinces, and Ningxia Autonomous Region, but not from Gansu Province. Whether leopards still occur in Qinghai Province is uncertain. The species has probably been extirpated in Hunan, Hubei, Zhejiang, Fujian, Guangxi and Jiangxi provinces. It is listed as nationally Critically Endangered, but receives little attention from Chinese wildlife biologists and conservationists. Fragmented leopard populations in central China have been subsumed to the Amur leopard, as there is no notable geographical barrier to northern China that would have prevented gene flow in the past.

The range of the snow leopard extends across the Himalayas, Tibetan Plateau, Karakorum Mountains, and Tian Shan in western China.

The clouded leopard occurs in forest regions south of the Yangtze River. It became locally extinct in Taiwan in 1972.

The Chinese mountain cat is endemic to China and lives on the north-eastern edge of the Tibetan Plateau. It was recorded only in eastern Qinghai and north-western Sichuan. It was photographed by a camera-trap for the first time in 2007. One individual was observed and photographed in May 2015 in the Ruoergai grasslands.

The range of the Eurasian lynx includes the Greater Khingan Mountains of Northeast China.
The Pallas's cat occurs at high altitudes on the Tibetan Plateau and in western China.

The Asiatic wildcat is distributed in Xinjiang, Qinghai, Gansu, Ningxia, Shaanxi, and Inner Mongolia. Within Xinjiang, it has been confined to three southern prefectures: Bayingolin Mongol Autonomous Prefecture, Aksu and Hotan. It is declining rapidly in its natural habitat in the Xinjiang desert region of China mainly because of excessive hunting for pelt trade followed by shrinkage of its habitat due to cultivation, oil and gas exploration and excessive use of pesticides.

The Asian golden cat and leopard cat  have been recorded in the Changqing National Nature Reserve in the Qinling Mountains and in the Tangjiahe National Nature Reserve in the Min Mountains. The leopard cat also occurs in the Wolong Nature Reserve and other protected areas in the Qionglai Mountains and Daliang Mountains.

Canines
The family Canidae has many members in China including the dog, wolf, dhole, red fox, corsac fox, Tibetan sand fox and common raccoon dog.  Two subspecies of wolf live in China—the Eurasian wolf, which is found in all of mainland China save for the islands in the South China Sea and the Tibetan wolf, which lives on the Tibetan Plateau. 

Some of the earliest dogs may have been domesticated in East Asia, and several Chinese dog breeds including the shar-pei and chow chow are among the most ancient in terms of DNA similarity to the gray wolf.

Dholes are found right now in only 6 provinces; Gansu, Yunnan, Tibet, Sichuan, and Xinjiang. 

The red fox, the largest fox species, can be found in every part of China except the northwest. The corsac fox is found in Northeast China and the Tibetan sand fox in Tibet, Qinghai, Sichuan, Gansu and Yunnan. 

The raccoon dog, one of the few canids that can climb trees, is native to eastern and northeastern China.

Pandas, bears
The giant panda, perhaps China's most famous wildlife species, lives in six patches of highland valleys of the Min, Qionglai, Liang, Daxiangling, Xiaoxiangling and Qinling Mountains of the upper Yangtze River basin, which are spread over 45 counties in Sichuan, Gansu and Shaanxi.  Only about 1,600 live in the wild (80% in Sichuan) along with about 300 in captivity in Chinese breeding centers and zoos.  The animal is rare and elusive.  Though classified as an omnivore, the giant panda's diet is over 90% bamboo.  Its black and white coloration provides a degree camouflage in the dense forests, but the adult animal has no natural predators.  Giant pandas are notoriously difficult to breed; they have short mating periods, and give birth to only one or two cubs per year.  The giant panda cub is the smallest baby, compared in proportion to the parents, of any placental mammal.  The giant panda is considered to be a national treasure and is an endangered species protected by state law.  Since the 1970s, giant pandas have been given or lent to foreign zoos as gesture of diplomatic goodwill.

Other more common bears in China include the Asiatic black bear and the brown bear which are found across much of the country.  Sub-species of the brown bear include the Himalayan brown bear and the Tibetan blue bear in Tibet, and the Ussuri brown bear in Northeast China.  The sun bear is found in Yunnan. Bears, especially black bears, are also raised in captivity to harvest their bile for use in traditional Chinese medicine.

The red panda - which unlike the giant panda is not a bear and more closely resembles a raccoon - is from a separate family by itself (Ailuridae), and is found in Sichuan and Yunnan.

Viverridae and Herpestidae
The viverrid and mongoose families of small carnivores are represented by numerous members occurring in southern China, including binturong, large Indian civet, small Indian civet, Owston's palm civet, masked palm civet, Asian palm civet, small-toothed palm civet, crab-eating mongoose and small Indian mongoose.

Otter, badger, weasel, marten, wolverine

The largest family of carnivorous mammals belongs to the otters, badgers, weasels, martens, and wolverines, all of which are found in China.  All of these mustelids are short, furry animals with short, rounded ears and thick fur, but they differ markedly in size, habit and habitat.

The sable, a species of marten, is prized for its fine fur, which along with ginseng and deer antler velvet, are known as the "three treasures of Manchuria."  The sable is found in Manchuria (also called the Northeast) and Altai region of northern Xinjiang.  The beech marten of western China and yellow-throated marten of southern China are closely related to the sable.

The Siberian weasel, known locally as the "yellow rat wolf," is the most common weasel in China.  It is found throughout China Proper and Manchuria, and known to steal poultry from farmers but helps to control the rodent population.  Hair from the tail of the Siberian weasel is used to make ink brush for traditional Chinese calligraphy.  Other weasel species include the least weasel and stoat in the north, yellow-bellied weasel and back-striped weasel in the south, and mountain weasel in the west.  The steppe polecat is bigger than the Siberian weasel and found across northern China.

In Chinese, the wolverine is called "sable bear" because it is bigger than a sable and smaller than a bear and resembles both animals. The animal lives in caves and dens, which they do not dig but take from other animals such as bears, foxes and Bobak marmots.  Wolverines are fierce creatures that will fight bears and wolves for food.  They are found in the Greater Khingan range of Heilongjiang and Inner Mongolia and the Altai Mountains of northern Xinjiang, and number only about 200.

The European otter is found throughout much of Eurasia and China. It is nearly extinct on Taiwan though some have been found on the island of Kinmen, off the coast of Fujian.  The Oriental small-clawed otter is the smallest otter species and lives in mangrove and freshwater swamps of southern China and Taiwan.  The smooth-coated otter is confined to parts of Yunnan and Guangdong.

Like sable and martens, otter fur is also used make clothing.  Sables and wolverines are Class I protected species.  Martens and otters are Class II protected species.

Badgers have distinctive white stripes on their faces with one long stripe that extends from nose to tail.  The Asian badger is found throughout China Proper and the eastern Himalayas.  The hog badger has a pig-like snout and has a slightly smaller range than the Asian badger. Ferret-badgers are the smallest badgers and two species live in China.  The Chinese ferret-badger is found across much of southern China south of the Yangtze River and the Burmese ferret-badger along Yunnan's border with Laos and Vietnam.

Seals, sea lions
Pinnipeds are also classified as carnivores and are divided between earless or true seals and eared seals.  True seals do not have ears and cannot get their hind flippers underneath their bodies to crawl.  Eared seals, which include sea lions, in contrast, have protruding ears and can "walk" with all four limbs on land.

True seals in China include the bearded seal which is found along the coast of Zhejiang, Fujian and Guangdong in the East and South China Sea, the ringed seal in the Yellow Sea, and spotted seal, which is primarily found in the Bohai Gulf and the northern Yellow Sea, but have been seen as far south as Guangdong.  All seals are Class II protected animal. Sea lions have Class I protection.

The spotted seal is the only seal species that breeds in China. Its breeding grounds are found along the rim of Liaodong Bay in the Bohai Gulf, including the estuary at the mouth of the Shuangtaizi River near Panjin and Changxing Island near Dalian, and Baengnyeongdo sanctuary in Korean EEZ. These seals have been poached for its fur and genitals, which were utilized to make an aphrodisiac. Their habitats have also been heavily damaged by land reclamation, fish farming, and petroleum development. A South Korean NGO has been trying to increase public awareness and support for the protection of the seals in China, North Korea and South Korea.  Protection stations have been set up to monitor the breeding grounds and wildlife protection authorities compensate fisherman who turn in live seals caught in their nets.  In April 2011, the construction of an express highway along the coast was halted due to its adverse impact on the seal breeding ground. Satellite trackings revealed that not only within Yellow Sea, but also seals can migrate even between Primorsky Krai in Russia to Yellow Sea, exceeding 3,300 km in total. Recoveries and recolonizations have been observed recently, such as along the coast of Shandong in 1999, and in the Miaodao Islands of the Bohai Sea since 2000s.

The northern fur seal, an eared seal, occasionally appears off the coast of eastern and southern China and southern Taiwan.  The largest of the eared seals is the Steller sea lion, who lives primarily in the Arctic but is also seen along the Yellow Sea coast in Jiangsu and Bohai Gulf in Liaoning. Among Yellow sea – adjacent areas within Korean EEZ, occurrence can be on locations such as at Jeju Island.

Whales, dolphins, porpoises
China has cetacean species that live in both freshwater and the sea.  The nearly extinct baiji dolphin and Chinese white dolphin are Class I protected species. All other cetaceans in China are Class II protected species.

In total, 22 species of smaller cetaceans inhabit within Chinese, Taiwanese, Hong Kong's, and Macau's waters including Baiji. Although being not officially recognized, the presence of Irrawaddy dolphins have been questioned.

In ancient China, inscriptions of the whales varied and inscriptions of whales and sharks were occasionally mixed. During the Qing Dynasty, certain knowledge on whales had been deepened with the establishment of whaling industries in Guangdong, Guangxi and Hainan although both oceanic and freshwater dolphins had been classified as different animals from whales. It is said that climate change during the dynasty caused small fish to flourish within Yellow and Bohai Seas and drew large numbers of whales into the basins.

The Republic of China was one of the early signatories of the International Convention for the Regulation of Whaling. The People's Republic of China signed convention in September 1980 and banned domestic whaling in 1981, and also signed in the Convention on the Conservation of Migratory Species of Wild Animals.

Until recently, observing live cetaceans nonetheless of any species including minke whales and smaller dolphins and porpoises are very rare in Bohai and Yellow Seas within Chinese side,however, increases in confirmation of minke whales and other species have been confirmed in larger part of Yellow Sea basin especially around Changhai County due to improves in water quality and productivity achieved by fishery regulations and creating ocean farms on Zhangzi Island, and local industries have been considered to operate whale watching tours as a future prospect. Modern distributions of cetaceans both on continent and oceanic islands including Taiwan are largely biased on toothed whales due to severe declines of baleen whales.

Baiji

The baiji dolphin's habit historically covered much of the Yangtze River and its tributaries and lakes, from Yichang to Shanghai.  It is mentioned in historical records going back 2,000 years.  According to legend, the baiji dolphin is the reincarnation of a princess and called the "Goddess of the Yangtze."  As recently as the 1950s, there were as many as 6,000 baiji dolphins in China, but their number fell to the hundreds by the 1980s, under 100 in the 1990s and fewer than a dozen since 2000.

The Yangtze River catchment area is one of the most densely populated areas in China and the world.  The river, China's longest, is also a major highway for ships.  Water and noise pollution, commercial fishing, and large propellers of ships are all major threats to the baiji.  The building of the Gezhouba Dam in the 1970s and the Three Gorges Dam in the 1990s blocked the access of the dolphins upstream, altered the seasonal flow of the river, and enabled large oceangoing ships to sail on the river.

By 1997, a survey of the river found only 13 baiji.  A Sino-Swiss joint survey of the river from Yichang to Shanghai in 2006 found no animals and declared the species to be functionally extinct, that is, even if a few individuals continued to survive, their numbers are too few to reproduce.  The last sighting confirmed by zoologist was in 2004 when a dead baiji dolphin washed ashore near Nanjing.

Nature reserves to protect the baiji dolphin were established along the Yangtze in Hunan, Hubei and Anhui province, along with observation and captive centers. The longest living baiji dolphin in captivity, Qiqi, lived in a dolphinarium in Wuhan from 1980 to 2002.  The Tian-e-Zhou Oxbow Nature Reserve, created out of an oxbow bend in the Yangtze was designed as a captive breeding area for the baiji.  One baiji was sent there in 1995 but died in 1996.  The reserve is now a breeding ground for the finless porpoise.

Finless porpoise

At least two subspecies of finless porpoise are known to inhabit coastal waters such as off Dalian< Nanjing, Nanji Islands Marine Sanctuary, Jiushan Chain IslandsWeizhou Island, and at Matsu Islands. A freshwater subspecies lives in the Yangtze, Gan and Xiang Rivers.  Unlike dolphins, they lack a dorsal fin. The freshwater porpoise faces the same threat as the baiji.  In April 2012, twelve were found dead in Dongting Lake in a span of 44 days. Construction of the Poyang Lake Dam may cause severe damages on remaining population.

As of 2012, the Tian-e-Zhou Oxbow Nature Reserve had about 40 finless porpoises with another 85 in Dongting Lake and 300–400 in Poyang Lake.  The freshwater finless porpoise, a Class II protected species, is rarer than the giant panda. They are also well present in Gulf of Tonkin.

In recent years, small concentrations have been confirmed at the estuaries on the mouth of Yellow River in Lijin County. Stable numbers of porpoises, two subspecies being involved, have been found recently along Chongming Island where the local waters show drastic recovery thanks to efforts to improve water quality.

Oceanic dolphins

Sousa, the Chinese white dolphin (locally called the Matsu's fish) that was previously considered to be a subspecies of the Indo-Pacific humpback dolphin, lives in the waters off southern China including Wanshan Archipelago, Nanji Islands, the Pearl River Delta, and Hong Kong, Gulf of Tonkin Hainan Island such as around Sanya Bay, Leizhou Peninsula, Paracel Islands, and on Penghu Islands to along western coasts of Taiwan, mainland coasts along Formosa Strait such as at Xiamen and Xiapu County, and Nánpēng Islands Marine Sanctuary in Nan'ao County, and Sanniang Bay dolphin sanctuary in Qingzhou. The Chinese white dolphin is a symbol of Hong Kong, and special sanctuary has been declared to protect the species with approaches to co-exist with sustainable dolphin watching, although the local population is in serious peril.

Other oceanic dolphin species include the Pacific white-sided, spinner, striped, short-beaked common, long-beaked common, Fraser's, pantropical spotted, rough-toothed, common bottlenose, Indo-Pacific bottlenose, and Risso's dolphin. Risso's dolphins are one of the most commonly observed cetacean along east coasts of Taiwan.

Whales

Whales were historically abundant along Chinese and Taiwanese waters especially in winter and spring seasons where they come to coastal areas to breed and calve while especially baleen whales other than those migrated from outer pacific and Sea of Japan swam northward to feed in Yellow and Bohai basins during warmer seasons. Most of large whales in Taiwan were recorded prior to 1952. In imperial times, villages along the coast of the Leizhou Peninsula in Guangdong hunted whales and made offerings of whale oil to the emperor in Beijing. On the other hand, however, like among other nations such as in Korea, China, Ebis in Japan, Indonesia, among Indochina including in Vietnam where whales were once well respected, heavenly deities among coastal people, regarded as the "King of the sea", the "Dragon emperor in the ocean", or "Dragon Soldiers" in almost entire coastal regions excluding above mentioned Hainan and Leizhou, as when whales were seen, fishermen and boats had to make ways for them and wait the whales to pass. In Chinese mythology, for example, Yu-kiang, the ruler of the sea, is said to be a whale with arms and legs. Indigenous tribes on Taiwan also recognized the presences of large whales and representing whales in their local myths and folklores.

Baleen whales found in the ocean off China's coast include the blue whale, the world's largest animal, as well as the Eden's, Omura's, Bryde's, common minke, fin, sei, and humpback whale. There had been an endemic, resident population of fin whales in Yellow and Bohai Sea to East China Sea historically. Minke whales are also resident in the same regions. Bryde's whales were considered to be historical residents along Taiwan and southern coasts.

In Chinese EEZ, critically endangered North Pacific right whales and western gray whales had been sighted in the East China Sea and Yellow Sea only on prior to 1970s especially for right whales while there had been records of gray whales and the only record in 21st century was of a matured female accidentally being killed in local fisheries in Pingtan on Taiwan Strait in 2007.

Following statements can be said for all larger baleen and toothed whales, but especially focusing on right whales and gray whales in here because of their behavioral patterns (very high reliances on shallow waters comparison to their size that even entering rivers mouths and estuaries regularly, their strong curiosities towards mankind) eased hunters to kill them and were wiped out much faster than the other species followed by humpbacks. Other rorquals' situations were very similar to them, but their local extinction (functionally) occurred later in 20th century by modern Japanese industries.

Today, biology and natural histories of baleen or larger toothed whales in Chinese waters prior to exploitations are very unclear because at those times when academic studies or approaches to biology of cetaceans, or recordings of cetacean catches in coastal China started to develop, as whales were already in fewer numbers not enough for descent, feasible for academic accounts, catch recordings in local fisheries or industries weren't even conducted. This was likely to be caused as the local populations of migratory whales were intensively hunted to the point of near-functional extinctions on the main migratory collider (Japanese archipelago) by Japanese whaling industries. The fates of right whales, for example, were even cornered further by American Yankee whaling, Japanese mass illegal and research whaling, and the most devastatingly, Soviet Union's mass illegal whaling in 1960s to 70s with helps by Japan.

Gray whales migrating on both of Japanese coasts were wiped out earlier than the Korean counterpart, then the other population migrating along Korean Peninsula later being targeted to the extinction by Japanese industries. The most intensive hunts of all times were carried out by Japanese whaling industries that covering wide range of east Asian waters including almost entire EEZ of China, North Korea and South Korea in the 20th century. Whaling stations were established in various areas along Chinese and Korean coastlines such as at Daya Bay, causing today's serious perils of whale populations and virtual, functional extinctions of almost all species or local stocks of larger baleen whales in east and southeast Asian nations. Any presences of larger cetaceans have not been confirmed for often or any.

Toothed whales, excluding dolphins, include the sperm, dwarf sperm, pygmy sperm, Baird's beaked, Longman's beaked, Cuvier's beaked, Blainville's beaked, ginkgo-toothed beaked whales, and the orca and pilot whales (false killer, pygmy killer, melon-headed, short-finned pilot). False killers still remain along coasts of mainland China, and are known to enter rivers regularly in particular regions.

Stranding of toothed whales has been common on Taiwanese coasts.

Large whales have become very rare on today's Chinese coasts where only tiny remnants of minke whales or several more survived. However, whale watching industries became popular attractions along the east coast of Taiwan, offering excellent opportunities to observe majestic creatures, especially in the summer. Recently, possibilities of establishing watching activities have been considered in Yellow Sea based on recoveries in numbers of whales observed. Larger types of rorquals have been sighted in pelagic waters occasionally.> Whales migrating through Tsushima Strait to possibly Chinese waters are under serious threats of being struck by high-speed vessels.

Yankee and modern whaling records suggest that there had been historical summering and wintering/calving grounds for baleen whales in various areas along coastal China particularly in several locations. Below is a list showing some of those areas corresponding with baleen and few of larger toothed whales, but excluding undiscovered or unstudied regions and species.

Baleen Whales

Right whales – Yellow Sea (especially adjacent to the island of Haiyang Dao where the junction of warmer and colder ocean currents exists nearby and all the modern appearances of the species on mainland coasts of China were concentrated), Shanghai and Zhoushan Islands, Guangdong and Huiyang, and in Taiwan Strait such as along coasts of Fujian (e.g.Pingtan Island), Penghu Islands, and Taiwan, and some reaching Hainan and Leizhou The first stranding of the species in China was on Shandong Province between 2000 and 2006. The first sighting in China was at Shenzhen in 2015 although the observation was reported as a humpback, and the first of living animal in Sea of Japan since after the whaling was recorded at Namhae near Busan in February 2015 and this was the first confirmation of the species since after the last record in Korean EEZ in 1974. Since 1901, records have been concentrated to the vicinity of Amami Ōshima including sightings in 1997 and 2014, and the first confirmed whale in west coast of Kyushu strayed into the port of Ushibuka, Kumamoto in 2014.
Based on studies to indicate possible coastal forging grounds, wintering distributions quite possibly included areas along Zhejiang coasts as well. It is unknown whether or not there had been a population for this species to summer in Yellow and Bohai Sea prior to exploitations, however occurrences of copepods within the basins and geographical natures indicate some whales might have summered there.
Gray and humpback whales – Yellow and Bohai Sea such as at Qingdao, Zhoushan Islands, Taiwan, Zhejiang, Guangdong, Nánpēng Islands, Liaonin, Fujian to south of Hailing Bay, Daya Bay, Hong Kong, Hainan, Qizhou Liedao Islands (humpback), Wailuo Harbour, Paracel Islands, and so on.
Only about 130 gray whales survive today, but some recent studies indicate that the original Asian population might have been functionally extinct, and those whales seen on Sakhalin and Kamchatka could originate in the well-recovering eastern population. Fossil and catch records suggest there were once wintering/calving areas in Taiwan and adjacent areas. The most recent known record in Korean waters was the sighting of a pair off Bangeojin, Ulsan in 1977.
In 2011, presences of gray whales were acoustically detected among pelagic waters in East China Sea between Chinese and Japanese waters.
Quantities of historical catches of humpbacks on southern coasts of the nation were small hence it is difficult to detect the original population size before exploitations. There was once a well-established forging area in southern coasts along Bashi Channel around Kenting National Park or at southern coasts and islands of Taiwan like Xiaoliuqiu Island and Dapeng Bay. Today, their numbers being confirmed in these areas and along east coast of Taiwan are very small despite observation efforts conducted by whale-watching companies, understandably for mainland coasts. More than several sightings including of a cow-calf pair have occurred along east coasts of Taiwan. Whales were once abundant at least on Pingtung areas and sporadic individuals have been observed off east coasts and Hualien and at islands such as Green Island and Orchid Island. The first confirmations in Taiwan was in 1994 of a pair off Hualien, and successful fleeing from entanglement off Taitung in 1999. Since in 2000 when a whale was sighted around Orchid Island, sightings have been reported almost annually at the Green island and Orchid Island, however, relative short stays in these waters indicate recoveries as winter forging grounds has not occurred yet. There have been two documented sightings of humpback whales around Hong Kong in 2009 and 2016. Possibly the first confirmed sighting in Yellow Sea of three animals including a cow calf pair, was recorded off Changhai County in 2015. Very small numbers of whales are now migrating through Sea of Japan and Tsushima Strait, and further reaching Korean Peninsula.
Based on studies on historical catches and observations, some gray whales could have occurred year-round off China, possibly summering in Bohai Sea.  There had been at least 24 records of gray whales in Chinese waters since 1933 including sightings, strandings, and bycatch. DNA analysis of 2011 specimen indicate that this female might not originate in the western population. Whether or not humpback whales ever summered within Yellow and Bohai basins historically is unknown.
Bryde's or Eden's whales – Historically residential among Taiwan, Fujian and Guangdong to Hong Kong, Hainan and Leizhou, and Gulf of Tonkin such as off Weizhou and Xieyang Islands. There have been occasional reported sightings on today including in areas within Hong Kong and Macau to Gulf of Tonkin, and strandings had been reported from various areas such as on Zhoushan. The number of whales currently migrating through Tsushima Strait is not clear although they have been observed on numerous occasions especially by the Japan Coast Guard. 24 Bryde's or Eden's whales were caught in Korean EEZ in the mid-1970s, and one was sighted in the Sea of Japan in 1994.
Fin whales – Historically residential in Yellow and Bohai Sea to East and South China Seas such as off Paracel Islands, and at least two other local groups, Sea of Japan residents and the group once migrated along the Pacific side of Japanese archipelago, once migrated to Chinese waters The East China Sea group is considered to be either functionally extinct or critically endangered due to being one of main targets by Japanese whaling in 20th century, and today there have been occasional strandings or findings of deceased individuals along sporadic areas from Yellow and Bohai Seas to other parts including southern shores like at Kam District in Wenchang, Shanghai (although the whale was speculated to have died in offshore waters), and Ningbo. The last of confirmed sightings on Taiwan is unknown although some media and tourism operators claim that migrations still occur, and whales might still migrate in pelagic waters. The only modern record among Ryukyu Islands was of a rotten carcass beached on Ishigaki Island in 2005. The last of known records on Korean Peninsula was in 1973, but there have been recent by-catches along the coasts. Regarding Yellow Sea, a juvenile was accidentally killed along Boryeong in 2014. Some whales still live in Sea of Japan and pass through Tsushima Strait. There had been congregation areas adjacent to Korean Peninsula such as in East Korea Bay and Ulleungdo, although recent occurrences into these locations are of unclear due to locational disorders.
Fin whales in Yellow Sea could have been a unique form from outer Pacific populations due to their smaller size, and breeding season was mainly in winter.
Minke whales – Still be present regularly (although very rare to observe live individuals) in Yellow and Bohai sea (resident group), Zhoushan, and in any coastal and oceanic island areas (e.g. Zhoushan, Penghu, and Parcel Archipelagos). Likely to breed in early to mid – summer, and possibly 4 major migratory routes exists within Yellow and Bohai Seas such as along Liaoning Bay, Bohai Strait, and Shandong Peninsula. Off Taiwan, recent sightings and entanglements occurred along east coasts such as at San Diego, Taiwan Strait, or at Hualien. Strandings and by-catches have been in higher rates in Bohai Sea and at the islands of Haiyang and Zhangzi.
Blue and sei and Omura's whales – largely unknown. At least blues were historically known to visit into Yellow and Bohai Sea and migrate further south to Paracel Islands. One was sighted off Weizhou Island in 2017.
Blue whale populations in coastal northwestern Pacific likely became extinct due to heavy exploitation in 20th century along southern Japan especially on Wakayama and Shikoku and Miyazaki where the last known catches in East China Sea (Amami Oshima) were in 1934. The most recent of recorded stranding on Japanese archipelago other than Ryukyu Islands were in 1950s, and only 3 blue whales have been recorded in Far Eastern Russian waters from 1994 to 2004. Gigantic whales exceeding over 20m in length have been observed in Tsushima Strait in recent years although their exact species are unknown. There was a stranding in Wanning in 2005. It is unclear whether or not those whales confirmed in Bohol Sea in recent years include any remnants of blue whales historically seen in Chinese EEZ, since it was speculated that these whales are pygmy blue whales from southern hemisphere.
Historic distributions and occurrences, and current statuses of Sei, Bryde's (offshore form) and Omura's whales in Chinese and Korean waters are unclear, but their known ranges in Chinese waters reach from mid to southern coasts facing East China Sea and Taiwan to South China Sea. Scientific confirmation of Omura's whales among continental waters was rather recent. Strandings of Omura's whales have been recorded only south from Zhejiang Country. Occasionally, either bryde's or omura's whales have been spotted along east Taiwanese coasts during whales watch cruises, Sightings have been along Taiwanese coasts such as nearby Hualien. and there was a case of re-floating stranded bryde's whale along Nantong in 2005.

Toothed Whales

Sperm whales – the only large cetacean still being common in the nation's present waters; being one of the main targets of whale-watching industries along the east coast of Taiwan, as well as islands such as Xiaoliuqiu and the Spratly Islands. Some might appear around Hainan Islands although their current status in this region is unclear. Occasionally strands on mainland shores even in Yellow and Bohai regions. They don't appear often in mainland's near-shore waters because of their feeding partiality to prefer deep sea canyons. Sperm whales actually do appear in near-shore waters in some cases; at locations where deep waters approach shores, or some particular individuals or groups have learned to come to rest in shallow bays or straits or along beaches. There had been sightings of 9 whales in East China Sea off Korean Peninsula in 1999, and 8 whales off eastern Korean Peninsula in 2004. The last catches were of 5 whales off Ulsan in 1911.
Baird's beaked whales – The second largest of Odontoceti and being extreme divers after sperm whales. Next to nothing about this species' natural histories and biology in Chinese waters are clear as the species has been considered not to occur, and the locational origin of the skeletal specimen at the Zhejiang Museum of natural History is unclear. It is a question that whether this species could still be present within Chinese EEZ or not although some groups on Japanese archipelago still survive but in under serious danger by today's commercial whaling activities. Based on archeological reports, these elusive, friendly whales by nature once had been regular among Yellow/Bohai Seas region notably around Lingshan Island off Huangdao District or the mouth of Jiaozhou Bay and off Dalian at least until mid-16th century, but they were seemingly wiped out by Japanese whalers. Southern limits of their distributions in Chinese waters are unclear while a stranding or a catch was recorded in Zhoushan in 1950s. 12 whales were bycaught along eastern Korean Peninsula between 1996 and 2012.
Longman's beaked whales and other beaked whales – Being one of newly classified and less known species, their overall distributions have been rather unclear. They are the second largest of beaked whales and third largest of toothed whales can be seen in Chinese EEZ. In Chinese waters, either live or deceased records were concentrated on east coast of Taiwan and surrounding waters including Lanyu and Green Island. Based on studies, presences of other beaked whales, being lesser known as well, have been confirmed to be common around Taiwanese waters, and Taiwan is one of fewer locations where beaked whales have been observed with higher regularities during whale watching tours. Stejneger's beaked whales are resident in Sea of Japan, and one of the most commonly recorded ziphiidae species of the Korean Peninsula although their presence within Yellow Sea is rather unclear.
Orcas – The current status of killer whales along the nation's coasts and surrounding areas is unclear. Sighting is more common along eastern Taiwanese coasts such as off Chenggong while on mainland, they do occur on almost the entire shoreline from Bohai and Yellow Sea in north to Ningbo and Zhoushan Archipelago in east, and along the southern coasts and islands including Paracel Islands as well. There was a commercial catch on southern Taiwan in 1990s. They still occur in few numbers in Korean side of Yellow Sea or nearby such as the sightings of pairs in 2001 and 5 or 6 whales off Wando (island) within the Dadohaehaesang National Park in 2016.
Short-finned pilot whales – So called the "Southern Form" of the species ranges within the Chinese waters. Most of live and deceased records concentrate on eastern coasts of Taiwan. Mainland distributions are rather unclear as there had been only one stranding record in Hainan, including regularities of occurrences within Yellow Sea regions, but occasional strandings have been recorded such as at Taeanhaean National Park or Jeju. There was a mass stranding at Nanji Islands in 2004.
False killer whales – One of few species surviving today in descent numbers on mainland coasts, but in peril; any warmer regions such as Taiwan, Nánpēng Islands, Nanji Island Marine Sanctuary, Matsu Islands, Langyatai on Huangdao District, Dongshan County, Hong Kong, Paracel Islands, and so on.
False killer whales along continental China are known to often enter and swim up large rivers in pods or large numbered schools, reaching more than 30 to 50 km, or individuals can travel further for 220 to 300 km in extreme cases. Rivers and canals in Xiangshui County such as Guanhe, Jiangsu, Huai, and Tongyu (通榆河) rivers have local legends of "鲸拜龙王" (Worshiped Whale Dragon King), telling that every spring whales gather at river mouths and swim up. In recent years, especially from earlier 2000s, false killer whales have been observed to swim up rivers rather regularly, showing dramatic recoveries and their numbers are rising up once again, up to more than 200 whales. Whales occasionally appear in Jiaozhou Bay where was once a regular range for the species until in 1980s.

Dugongs

Dugongs are marine mammals that feed entirely on vegetation such as seagrass. They are related to manatees in the Western Hemisphere, and are only sirenian species found in Asian waters. In China, dugongs are found along the coasts of the Guangxi Zhuang Autonomous Region, where the Hepu Dugong National Nature Reserve, near Beihai, was created in 1992 for their protection, and less frequently in Hainan. Current distributions could be much more restricted than that of pre-exploitation ranges, as once might have been seen in the Yellow sea regions.

They are considered regionally extinct in Taiwan. The dugong is a Class I protected species. They were hunted for their meat in the late 1950s and early 1960s during the Great Leap Forward. Dugongs are threatened by the loss of seagrass beds from coastal development. Several areas still possess feasible habitats for dugongs today such as the Dongsha Atoll and the west coasts of Hainan and Leizhou Peninsula, and Chinese government funded to establish a sanctuary designed for dugong and mangrove conservation ranging from Hepu County to Shankou in Guanxi, also to secure local Chinese white dolphins. Individuals distributed among the Beibu Gulf Economic Rim in Gulf of Tonkin face threats of busy-becoming ship-lanes and polluted waters.

Elephant

Asian elephants once roamed a large swath of China, but are now confined to the Xishuangbanna and Pu'er Prefectures of southern Yunnan.  Xishuangbana means 12 elephants in the local Thai language. In recent years, Chinese demand for ivory has led to a sharp increase in elephant poaching around the world. Due to strict enforcement of elephant protection laws with capital punishment for poachers and government financed feeding programs, the population of elephants within China from 1994 to 2014 roughly doubled to nearly 300.

Odd-toed ungulates

Rhino

Records and artwork from antiquity indicate that three species of Asian rhinoceros, the Indian, Javan and Sumatran, more specially the Northern Sumatran rhinoceros have lived in China. During the Shang Dynasty, some 3,000 years ago, rhinoceros ranged as far north as Inner Mongolia. By the beginning of the Han Dynasty, 2,200 years ago, they had disappeared from the Central Plains of northern China.

During the Tang Dynasty, about 1,200 years ago, rhinos were found across southern China and the imperial zoo had a captive breeding program that returned some animals to the wild. Cooler climate in northern China may have caused rhinoceros habitat to shrink, but it was demand for rhino horns for use in traditional Chinese medicine, documented in as early as the Song Dynasty 1,000 years ago, that drove the animal toward extinction.

In the Ming Dynasty about 650 years ago, rhinoceros were confined to Yunnan and Guizhou, and by the Qing Dynasty to only Yunnan. The Qing government limited the hunting of rhinos to only officials, and some 300 horns were harvested between 1900 and 1910. The collapse of the Qing Dynasty in 1911 allowed individuals to hunt the animal. The last Sumatran rhino was killed in 1916, the last Indian rhino in 1920 and the last Javan rhino in 1922.

In 2010, a herd of nine southern white rhinoceros were imported from South Africa and shipped to Yunnan, where they were kept in a wild animal park for acclimation. In March 2013, seven of the animals were shipped to the Laiyanghe National Forest Park, a habitat where Asian rhinoceros once lived. Two of the African rhinos began the process of being released into the wild on 13 May 2014.

Horses and wild asses

The Przewalski's horse, the only species of wild horses never to have been domesticated, once roamed free in large parts of northwestern China but became locally extinct in 1957.  In the 1980s, herds from Europe have been introduced to habitats in Xinjiang and Gansu.

The other odd-toed ungulates in China are the Mongolian wild ass and the Tibetan wild ass (kiang).  The former is endangered while the latter is not. Both are Class I protected species.

Even-toed ungulates

Deer
China has a great variety of true deer and its close kin the musk deer. The largest deer species, the elk (known as the moose in North America), is found in the Greater and Lesser Khingan ranges of the northeast. The moose stands at 2 m tall and weighs as much 700 kg. In contrast, the lesser mouse-deer of Yunnan, which is just 45 cm in height and weighs 2 kg, is not much bigger than a rabbit.

China also contains the closely related elk and red deer, the second and fourth largest deer species, which until 2004 were considered the same species. The elk (also known as wapiti) has four subspecies in Asia – the Altai wapiti, Tian Shan wapiti, Manchurian wapiti and Alashan wapiti – all of which are present in China.  The red deer, though quite common in Europe, has subspecies in China that are endangered. The red deer are the deer that have been most important to human societies. 

The Yarkand deer lives along the Tarim River in Xinjiang south of the Tian Shan.  The Bactrian deer lives north of the Tian Shan in northern Xinjiang and Central Asian Republics.  The Tibetan red deer, Gansu red deer, Sichuan deer have been alternatively categorized as subspecies of the elk or the Central Asian red deer.

The sambar deer, the third largest deer species, is found throughout southern China, and on the islands of Hainan and Taiwan.  They live near water and are called "water deer" in Chinese. They are not to be confused with the Chinese water deer, a smaller deer which are found in the Yangtze Delta region. The water deer is the only species of true deer without antlers.

 
Water deer, tufted deer and muntjacs are small deer with long upper canines that protrude like tusks.  Muntjacs are known for their soft hide and tender meat. The Indian muntjac is found throughout southern China. The range of the Reeve's muntjac extends north to Gansu and to Taiwan. Fea's muntjac are found in eastern Tibet and the Gongshan muntjac in neighboring Yunnan. The hairy-fronted muntjac is endemic to the mountains at the juncture of Anhui, Zhejiang, Jiangxi and Fujian and is a protected species. The tufted deer, a close relative of the muntjac, is found throughout central China.

Deer is prized in China for the velvet of their antlers.  Antler velvet is rich in growth hormone and is used in traditional Chinese medicine. The most valuable antler velvet comes from the sika deer which is raised on farms. Several subspecies of the sika deer, including the Shanxi sika and the North China sika may have become extinct in the wild and survive exclusively in captivity. The Sichuan sika deer, another subspecies, was discovered in 1978 and lives in mountains of northern Sichuan and southern Gansu. The Formosan sika deer is endemic to Taiwan.

Reindeer, which are found in the forests of the Greater Khingan range in northern Inner Mongolia, are domesticated by the ethnic Ewenki and Oroqen people. The Oroqen call themselves, "people who use the reindeer." One branch of the Ewenki rely on reindeer to haul goods through swampy forests. They use reindeer milk and meat for nourishment, hides for clothing and tents, and antlers for medicine and income. The Kyrgyz people, who now reside in Central Asia and western Xinjiang, used to live in northeast Asia and regard the sika deer as a holy animal. According to Kyrgyz legend, the Kyrgyz Bugu tribe descended from a mother deer.

The sika deer is protected as a Class I endangered species by the state, though it is classified by the  International Union for Conservation of Nature (IUCN) as least concern. Another Class I protected deer is the Thorold's or white-lipped deer.  This large deer with a population of about 15,000 that is endemic to Qinghai, Gansu, Sichuan, Tibet and Yunnan, is considered vulnerable by the IUCN. The Chinese population of Eld's deer, a Class I protected species that is also considered endangered by IUCN, is found only on the island of Hainan. For decades, the Indochinese hog deer was believed to be extinct in China until a fawn was discovered in 2007 in the Yongde Daxueshan National Wildlife Reserve.  The Indochinese hog deer is also protected by the state.

Perhaps the most remarkable endangered deer species in China is Père David's deer. This deer, colloquially known as the sibuxiang or the "Four-Not-Look-Alike", is said to have the hooves of an ox, antlers of a deer, neck of a camel and tail of a donkey, but does not look like any one animal.  According to Chinese legend, this animal helped the ancient sage Jiang Ziya overthrow the tyrant king of the Shang Dynasty 4,000 years ago and became a symbol of good fortune. Chinese emperors kept the sibuxiang also called milu in imperial hunting parks, even as the animal became extinct in the wild, perhaps as early as 2,000 years ago. By 1866, when Father Armand David identified the animal, there were only 200–300 remaining in the Nanhaizi Royal Park in Beijing. A few animals were sold to zoos in Europe before 1894, when the park was flooded and some of the animals escaped only to be hunted and eaten. The last of the animals in China died during the chaos of the Boxer Rebellion.  In 1898, Herbrand Russell, 11th Duke of Bedford assembled a herd of 18 animals from European zoos and bred them at his estate, Woburn Abbey in England. In 1985, 22 deer from this herd was reintroduced back to the Nanhaizi Park in Beijing and in 1986 another 39 were sent to Dafeng, in northern Jiangsu on the Yellow Sea. In 1998, eight animals in the latter herd were introduced into wilderness of the Dafeng Milu National Wildlife Reserve. By 2013, the reserve had 196 Père David's deer.

The Siberian roe deer, once plentiful in the Northeast and favored as game meat, has also become a protected species. Hunting of roe deer was banned in 2000.

Musk deer and mouse-deer resemble small deer but are not true deer.  They do not have antlers or facial scent glands. Male musk deer have scent glands that secrete deer musk, which is used for perfume, incense and medicine. Of the seven musk deer species in the world, six are found in China and five are endangered: the Anhui musk deer and dwarf musk deer of central China, the alpine musk deer of western China, the white-bellied musk deer and black musk deer of Tibet. The Siberian musk deer in the northeast is considered vulnerable. The lesser mouse-deer is found in southern Yunnan.

Antelope

The grasslands, plateau and deserts of northern and western China are home to several species of antelope. The Mongolian gazelle, also known as the Zeren or yellow sheep, can run at speeds of up to 90 km/h and gather in herds by the thousands. They used to be spread over much of northern China but are now confined largely to Inner Mongolia. The Tibetan gazelle or goa antelope, is slightly smaller than the Mongolian gazelle, and lives on the Tibetan Plateau. The Przewalski's gazelle, whose males have distinctive horns that curl outward and then inward at the top, are extremely rare and endemic to a small region around Qinghai Lake on the northeastern part of the Tibetan Plateau. The goitered gazelle is about the same size as the Mongolian gazelle and is found throughout the Gobi Desert.

The Tibetan antelope, also known as chiru, is taller than the gazelles and has longer horns. It is endemic to the Tibetan Plateau and is endangered. The animal is poached for its fine wool, which is made by Kashmiri weavers into the Shahtoosh shawl. The film Kekexili: Mountain Patrol documents efforts to protect the animal from poaching. The Tibetan antelope was one of the mascots for the 2008 Summer Olympics.

The saiga antelope's horns are used in traditional Chinese medicine to treat a variety of ailments including the common cold. Despite its status as a Class I protected species, the saiga antelope has been poached to extinction in the Dzungar Basin of northern Xinjiang and is critically endangered in Central Asia and Russia.  Chinese police routinely interdict large batches of smuggled horns into Xinjiang. Attempts have been made to reintroduce the saiga antelope to habitats in China.

Goat antelopes
Serows, gorals, and the takin are called antelope by the Chinese, and goat antelope by western taxonomists.

The largest of these goat antelope is the takin, a relative of the musk ox. It lives in highlands from the eastern foothills of the Himalayas to the Qinling and shares habitat with the giant panda in Sichuan and Shaanxi. The takin is a Class I protected species.

Serows are smaller than takins but significantly larger than gorals. Both serows and gorals live in rainy mountainous regions and are excellent climbers. Serows have shorter and coarser wool than gorals. The mainland serow is spread across southern China. The range of the Chinese goral is even broader, extending to Korea in the northeast. The long-tailed goral lives in the northeast, along the borders with Russia and North Korea. The Himalayan serow, Himalayan goral, and red goral are found in southern Tibet. The Taiwan serow is endemic to Taiwan.

Mountain sheep and goat

The argali or mountain sheep, the Asian cousin of the North American bighorn sheep has nine subspecies, seven of which are found in northern and western China, including the Marco Polo sheep, which the Venetian traveler reported observing in the Pamir mountains.

The Himalayan blue sheep, with much smaller horns than the argali, are agile climbers on Himalayan cliffs.  The dwarf blue sheep is found in western Sichuan.  The Himalayan tahr, discovered in China in 1974, is a Class I protected species with perhaps only 500 animals in southern Tibet.

The Siberian ibex, the largest and heaviest goat, is found in the Tian Shan range of Xinjiang.

Cattle, camel, pig
There are large numbers of domesticated gaur, yak and Bactrian camel in China but in the wild, they are Class I protected species.  The gaur or Indian bison is the tallest species of cattle and found in southern Tibet and Yunnan.  Domesticated gaur, called gayal, is raised by farmers in Yunnan.  Yaks are the largest animals on the Tibetan Plateau. Wild yaks are larger than domestic yaks and slightly smaller than the gaur.  They can tolerate extremely cold climate, climb steep slopes, and ford fierce rapids.  Yaks are the imost important animal for Tibetan herders, who eat yak meat and milk for food, burn yak dung as fuel, spin yak hair into fabric, make yak hide leather and use yaks to transport and plow fields.  Bactrian camels have two humps and can go a month or longer without drinking water.  A thirsty Bactrian camel can drink 135 liters (30 gallons) in only 13 minutes.  They can withstand extremely hot and cold weather and have broad hooves that do not sink in desert.  Bactrian camels are known as the "boats of desert" – for millennia, they were used to carry goods along the Silk Road. Wild camels are critically endangered and found in the Gobi and Taklamakan Deserts. 

The wild boar, from which the farm-raised pigs was domesticated some 8,000 years ago in China, remains common in the Chinese wilderness.  On occasion, boars will interbreed with farm-raised pigs.  The Manchurian wild boar is the largest of the wild boar species.  The Formosan wild boar is a subspecies endemic to Taiwan.

Pangolin

The pangolin, a scaly anteater that feed on ants and termites and curl into a ball when threatened, is prized in China for its flesh, which is considered a delicacy and scales, which used in traditional Chinese medicine to treat among other ailments, inadequate lactation in breast-feeding mothers. The Chinese pangolin is found throughout southern China, Hainan and Taiwan and the Sunda pangolin in western Yunnan.  In Chinese, the pangolin is called "that which wears mountain armor" and the animal is believed by local shamans to hold magical powers such that hunters must utter incantation before killing them to ward off bad luck. As a Class II protected species, trading of wild pangolins is prohibited, but poaching and illegal trade remains rampant.  The pangolin can be farm-raised, but pangolin farms must generally also raise termites to feed the livestock.  In recent years, Chinese customs have intercepted large shipments of pangolin from Southeast Asia and Africa.

Rodents

Porcupine

The porcupine, called haozhu or "pig with long thin hair" in Chinese, should not be confused with hedgehog, ciwei or the "thorned creature".  Porcupines are rodents and hedgehogs belong to a separate order.  Three species of Old World porcupine are found in China: the Asiatic brush-tailed porcupine, Indian crested porcupine, and Malayan porcupine.  Many parts of the porcupine including the brain, organs, fat, quills and even the feces can be used to make traditional Chinese medicine.  Porcupines are raised on farms.

Beaver

In the early 20th century, the Eurasian beaver was hunted to near extinction for its fur and castoreum, a scent gland secretion used to make perfume and medicine.  Though the global population has rebounded, the animal remains a Class I protected species.  The Bulgan Beaver Nature Reserve in Qinggil County of northern Xinjiang, at the source of the Irtysh and Ulungur River along the border with Mongolia, was created in 1980 to protect the beaver.  In 2007, there were 145 beaver colonies with an estimated population of 500–600 beavers in the reserve.

Squirrels
Squirrels are called songshu or "pine rodent" in Chinese but not all species live in trees.  The squirrel family includes tree squirrels, flying squirrels, ground squirrels, rock squirrels, marmots and chipmunks, which are all found in China, often in great variety.

The red squirrel common in Europe and the black giant squirrel of Southeast Asia are found, respectively, in the northern and southern parts of China.  Other tree squirrel species include the Pallas's, inornate, Phayre's, Irrawaddy, Anderson's, orange-bellied Himalayan, Perny's long-nosed, red-hipped, Asian red-cheeked, Himalayan striped, Maritime striped, and Swinhoe's striped squirrel.

Flying squirrels are found in almost every part of China, from the Himalayas to the tropical island of Hainan to the rural outskirts of Beijing.  Flying squirrel species include the groove-toothed, complex-toothed, hairy-footed, particolored, Indochinese, red giant, red and white giant, spotted giant, Indian giant, Chinese giant, Japanese giant, Bhutan giant, Siberian, Yunnan giant (petaurista yunnanensis), and Hodgson's giant.  Several are endemic to China. 

Flying squirrels are timid creatures that are active at nighttime and use the patagium, a membrane connecting the fore and hind limbs to glide from trees.  They do not build nests and live in caves or rock crevices.  They also defecate at specific locations, which facilitates the harvest of their fecal pellets.  The pellets are made into wulingzhi, a traditional Chinese medicine used to facilitate blood flow and ease pain.  Flying squirrel pellets can accumulate on the floor of caves for years and not rot. Several species of flying squirrels are farm-raised to produce wulingzhi.

The groove-toothed flying squirrel, also known as the North Chinese flying squirrel, is endemic to eastern Hebei Province and the suburbs of Beijing in North China and northern Sichuan.  The complex-toothed flying squirrel is endemic to southern China.

Ground squirrels, rock squirrels, marmots and chipmunks belong to the same tribe within the squirrel family.

In China, ground squirrels are found in arid regions of the north and west where the animals live in burrels.  Ground squirrel species include the Alashan, Daurian, red-cheeked, long-tailed and yellow ground squirrel.

Two species of rock squirrels are endemic to China, the Père David's rock squirrel, which is found across a wide swath of the country from the mountains around Beijing to Gansu and Sichuan, and the Forrest's rock squirrel, found only in the mountains dividing the Yangtze and Mekong River watershed in northwestern Yunnan.

The Siberian chipmunk, the only chipmunk species found outside North America, has six subspecies in China, all in northern parts of the country.  The animal is raised as pets and for its tender flesh, fine fur and ingredients for traditional Chinese medicine.

The marmot, called hanta in Chinese for "land" or "dry otter," is related to ground squirrels but are bigger, have shorter tails and are more social animals.  They can grow to be the size of a cat and live in large colonies.  Four species are found in China, all along the northern and western periphery of the country: gray, long-tailed, Himalayan, and Tarbagan.  Of these, the tarbagan marmot is an endangered, Class III protected species.  Marmots are also farm-raised for food and fur.

Jumping rodents

A wide variety of jumping rodents belonging to the family Dipodidae can be found in China. These include jerboas and jumping mice, called tiaoshu, the "jumping rodent," and the birch mouse, called jueshu, the "falling rodent" or "stomping rodent."  Jerboas, jumping mice, and birch mice all have long hind legs which can be used to make leaps from a bipedal stance.

Zokors, bamboo rats

Zokors and bamboo rats are chubby and furry rodents with short limbs that burrow underground.

Zokors have strong front limbs for digging.  Zokor bones are used in traditional Chinese medicine and can substitute tiger bones.  The Chinese zokor, Rothschild's zokor and Smith's zokor are endemic to China.  The range of the Chinese zokor extends across north China from Qinghai to Beijing while that of the Rothschild's and Smith's zokors are confined to Gansu, Shaanxi, Hubei and Qinghai.  The false zokor and Transbaikal zokor are found along China's border region with Russia and Mongolia.

All four bamboo rat species in the world are found in China: the Chinese bamboo rat south of the Yangtze, hoary bamboo rat in southwest China, large bamboo rat in Xishuangbanna in southern Yunnan and lesser bamboo rat and western Yunnan. The large bamboo rat can weigh as much as 5 kg.  The flesh of the bamboo rat is rich in protein and low in fat.  Bamboo rat oil can be used to treat burn wounds.

Both the zokor and bamboo rat are farm-raised for their fur, meat and use in medicine.

Hamsters, lemmings, voles
About half of the world's 25 species of hamsters are found in China.  Most live in the deserts of Xinjiang, Gansu and Inner Mongolia.  Some are named after the specific region in which they are found, such as the Chinese, Mongolian, Gansu, Chinese striped, Tibetan dwarf, Kham dwarf, and Djungarian hamster, and some by their founder, such as Campbell's dwarf, Roborovski, and Sokolov's dwarf.  Others include the grey dwarf, long-tailed dwarf, greater long-tailed hamster and black-bellied hamster.  The Chinese hamster and Roborovski hamster have been bred as pets and found in homes throughout the world.*Eurasian water vole (Arvicola amphibius)

Mice and rats
Brown rat
Chinese dormouse (Chaetocauda sichuanensis)
Sichuan niviventer (Niviventer excelsior)
Yunnan hadromys (Hadromys yunnanensis)

Gerbils
Great gerbil (Rhombomys opimus)

Shrew moles
Chinese mole shrew (Anourosorex squamipes)

Pikas
Glover's pika (Ochotona gloveri)

Moles
Large mole (Mogera robusta)

Gymnures
Short-tailed gymnure (Hylomys suillus)

Treeshrews
Northern treeshrew (Tupaia belangeri)

Hedgehogs
The Amur hedgehog (Erinaceus amurensis) hails from Manchuria, China.

Hares
Chinese hare (Lepus sinensis)
Hainan hare
Manchurian hare

Bats
Bats, the only mammals capable of sustained flight, are the second largest order of mammals after rodents.  They are divided broadly into microbats, which use echolocation to navigate and hunt insects, and megabats, which rely on large eyes and keen smell to feed on fruits and nectar. Bats are found in great abundance and variety throughout China and are considered to be auspicious animals, symbolizing good fortune.  Bat feces collected from caves are used in traditional Chinese medicine.

Megabats

Megabats, also called fruit bats, include flying foxes, which are the largest bat species. Four species are found in China, all in isolated populations: the large flying fox in Shaanxi, Indian flying fox in Qinghai, Ryukyu flying fox in Taiwan, and Lyle's flying fox in Yunnan.

Geoffroy's rousette and Leschenault's rousette, both dog-faced fruit bats, are the only megabats in China that can echolocate. Unlike microbats, which generate ultrasound with their larynx, rousettes generate sonar sound waves with tongue clicks.

Other fruit bat species include the greater and lesser short-nosed fruit bat, Blanford's fruit bat and the cave nectar bat.  Fruit bats are sometimes considered pests by fruit farmers, and are hunted and eaten in parts of Guangdong, Guangxi and Hainan. They also help pollinate certain species of tropical fruit trees.

Microbats

Vesper bats
Vesper or evening bats comprise the largest family of bats with at least 45 species in China. Members include mouse-eared bats, long-eared bats, pipistrelles, noctules and barbastelles.

Myotis or mouse-eared bats are delicate and furry bats with pointed ears.  Of the 90 or so species in the world, about one-fifth are found in China.

The lesser mouse-eared bat, pond bat, Daubenton's bat, Natterer's bat and whiskered bat are spread across Eurasia.  Others inhabit either the warmer climes of southern China and Southeast Asia including the large myotis, Szechwan myotis, Burmese whiskered bat and Horsfield's bat or the temperate regions of northern China and Northeast Asia including the Far Eastern myotis, fraternal myotis, and Ikonnikov's bat. Hodgson's bat, known for its distinctive golden fur, has unconnected populations in Afghanistan, India, central China, southeastern China, Manchuria, Taiwan, Korea and Indonesia. The Beijing mouse-eared bat is endemic to eastern China, and the long-footed myotis is endemic to southern China and Hong Kong.

Most mouse-eared bats are insectivores. Rickett's big-footed bat, which is distributed across China Proper into Laos, lives near water and feeds on fish.  The large-footed bat of Taiwan hunts insects on the surface of the water.

Pipistrels and their relatives are tiny bats that flutter like butterflies in flight. Other pipistrelles found in China include the least pipistrelle, Kelaart's, Mount Popa, Savi's, chocolate black-gilded and the Chinese pipistrelle. In Chinese, pipistrelles are called fuyi meaning "hidden wing." The flesh, blood, brain and feces of pipistrelle can be used to make traditional Chinese medicine. The brain is applied to the skin to treat acne and ingested to improve memory.

Noctules are closely related to pipistrelles but can be much larger in size.  The Chinese noctule, which is endemic to the southern half of the country and Taiwan, weighs three to four times as much as the Chinese pipistrelle.  Known as "mountain bats" in Chinese, noctules live in caves and rock croppings as well as the under the eaves of traditional homes.  Noctules droppings are collected for medicinal uses.  Other noctule bats in China include the common noctule, lesser noctule, and birdlike noctule.

Barbastelles are called wide-eared bats in Chinese.  The range of the Asian barbastelle extends from Egypt through China to Japan.  In 2001, a Chinese zoologist discovered a new species of barbastelle in the mountains of rural Beijing.  This bat was discovered in a cave in Fangshan District where four other bat species—Rickett's big-foot, large mouse-eared, greater horseshoe and greater tube-nosed bats also live. 
The Beijing barbastelle (Barbastella beijingensis) was distinguished by the distinctiveness of its DNA and recognized as a species on 23 May 2007, the 300th birthday of Carl Linnaeus. As of 2012, no other populations of this species have been found beyond Beijing.

Long-eared bats have enormous ears that can grow almost as long as their bodies, and are represented in China by multiple species (e.g. Plecotus kozlovi, Plecotus ognevi...). The greater and lesser bamboo bats prefer to roost inside the hollow shoots of giant bamboo through holes eaten by beetles.  Because the holes are small, bamboo bats are also tiny.  An adult lesser bamboo bat that measures  in length and weighs , is not much bigger than a bumble bee.

House bats including the Gobi big brown bat, northern bat, thick-eared bat, serotine bat are also closely related to pipistrelles, noctules and barbastelles.  Other relatives within this extensive subfamily include Tickell's bat, great evening bat, harlequin bat, greater Asiatic yellow bat, particoloured bat and Asian particolored bat.

Tube-nosed bats have longer nostrils than other vespers and funnel-shaped ears.  Chinese species include the greater, little, round-eared, Hutton's, and dusky tube-nosed bat.  The dusky tube-nosed bat is endemic to Heilongjiang and Jilin in northeastern China.  The greater tube-nosed bat of Beijing feeds on aerial beetles.

The painted bat and Hardwicke's woolly bat, also vesper bats, live in the forests of southern China.

Long-winged bats

Long-winged bats in China include the common and western bent-winged bats.  The common bent-wing bats can form large colonies and migrate hundreds of kilometers.

Free-tailed bats
 Free-tailed bats, unlike other bats, have tails that are detached from their wing membrances.  Species include the European free-tailed bat, La Touche's free-tailed bat and the wrinkle-lipped free-tailed bat.

False vampire

The greater false vampire bat of Guangxi is a carnivorous bat that feeds on rodents, fish, insects and smaller bats.  It is smaller than the "true" vampire bats of South America.

Sac-winged bats

Sac-winged bats have sac-like glands under their wings that carry pheromones, which are released to attract mates. Out of some 51 sac-winged bat species in the world, only the black-bearded tomb bat is found in China.

Horseshoe bats
Horseshoe bats are called "chrysanthemum bats" in Chinese because they have horseshoe-shaped folds of skin that unfurl on their faces like the petals of a flower.  These noseleaves help the horseshoe bat emit ultrasonic signals for echolocation.  Species found in China include the greater, least, king, big-eared, rufous, Chinese rufous, little Japanese, Blyth's, Osgood's, Pearson's, Thomas's, and Dobson's.  The king and Osgood's horseshoe bats are endemic to southwest China.
Scientists believe that the SARS coronavirus may have originated in horseshoe bats in China.

Closely related to the horseshoe bats are the roundleaf bats, including the great roundleaf, intermediate roundleaf, Pomona and Pratt's, the East Asian tailless leaf-nosed bat and Stoliczka's trident bat.

Birds

The avifauna of China includes a total of 1314 species, of which 52 are endemic, two have been introduced by humans, and 55 are rare or accidental. One species listed is extirpated in China and is not included in the species count. Eighty seven species are globally threatened.

Pheasants

Chinese monal
Golden pheasant

Cranes and other wading birds
 Black-necked crane
Red-crowned crane
Common spoonbill

Reptiles

China has a big variety of reptiles including the Chinese alligator and the Yangtze giant softshell turtle.

Crocodilians

Chinese alligator (Alligator sinensis)

Lizards
Chinese crocodile lizard (Shinisaurus crocodilurus)
Chinese water dragon (Physignathus cocincinus)

Turtles and tortoises
Elongated tortoise (Indotestudo elongata)
Cantor's giant softshell turtle (Pelochelys cantorii) 
Yangtze giant softshell turtle (Rafetus swinhoei)

Snakes
Sharp-nosed pit viper (Deinagkistrodon acutus)
Dice snake (Natrix tessellata)
Twin-spotted ratsnake (Elaphe bimaculata)
Mamushi (Gloydius blomhoffii)
Grass snake (Natrix natrix)
Mountain pitviper (Ovophis monticola)
Jerdon's pit viper (Protobothrops jerdonii)
Bamboo pit viper (Trimeresurus gramineus)
Mangshan pitviper (Trimeresurus mangshanensis)
Motuo bamboo pitviper (Trimeresurus medoensis)
Stejneger's pit viper (Trimeresurus stejnegeri)

Amphibians

China is home to 346 species of amphibian.  China's amphibian diversity is greater than any other country in the Old World, and it is the 5th in the whole world. China's amphibian fauna includes an important element of widespread, generally non-threatened species though 27.3% of amphibian species are extinct or threatened and because conservation assessments of Chinese amphibians have only started recently, it is likely that the current data on threats to amphibians are insufficient. Several amphibian species in China have very limited geographical distributions.

Frogs

True Frogs (Ranidae)

Amolops aniqiaoensis
Amolops bellulus
Amolops chunganensis
Amolops gerbillus
Amolops granulosus
Amolops hainanensis
Amolops jinjiangensis
Amolops kangtingensis
Amolops liangshanensis
Amolops lifanensis
Amolops loloensis
Amolops mantzorum
Amolops medogensis
Amolops monticola
Amolops ricketti
Amolops torrentis
Amolops viridimaculatus
Amolops wuyiensis
Babina adenopleura
Babina hainanensis
Babina lini
Babina pleuraden
Chevron-spotted brown frog
Eastern golden frog
Emei music frog
Glandirana minima
Glandirana tientaiensis
Huanren frog
Imienpo Station frog
Johns' groove-toed frog
Korean brown frog
Odorrana andersonii
Odorrana anlungensis
Odorrana chapaensis
Odorrana chloronota
Odorrana exiliversabilis
Odorrana grahami
Odorrana graminea
Odorrana hejiangensis
Odorrana kuangwuensis
Odorrana lungshengensis
Odorrana margaretae
Odorrana mutschmanni
Odorrana schmackeri
Odorrana tiannanensis
Odorrana versabilis
Odorrana wuchuanensis
Pelophylax fukienensis
Pelophylax hubeiensis
Pelophylax lateralis
Pelophylax nigromaculatus
Pelophylax tenggerensis
Pelophylax terentievi
Plateau brown frog
Rana amurensis
Rana chensinensis
Rana omeimontis
Rana sangzhiensis
Rana weiningensis
Rana zhengi

Dicroglossidae

Chinese edible frog
Concave-eared torrent frog
Doichang frog
Fejervarya limnocharis
Fejervarya moodiei
Fejervarya multistriata
Limnonectes longchuanensis
Nanorana arnoldi
Nanorana blanfordii
Nanorana bourreti
Nanorana conaensis
Nanorana feae
Nanorana liebigii
Nanorana maculosa
Nanorana medogensis
Nanorana pleskei
Nanorana polunini
Nanorana quadranus
Nanorana taihangnica
Nanorana unculuanus
Nanorana ventripunctata
Nanorana yunnanensis
Northern frog
Kuhl's creek frog
Quasipaa verrucospinosa
Quasipaa boulengeri
Quasipaa exilispinosa
Quasipaa jiulongensis
Quasipaa shini
Quasipaa spinosa
Quasipaa yei
Round-tongued floating frog

Ceratobatrachidae

Liurana

Tree Frogs

Annam tree frog
Common Chinese tree frog
Hyla sanchiangensis
Hyla zhaopingensis: only in Zhaoping County, Guangxi
Hylarana cubitalis
Hylarana hekouensis
Hylarana latouchii
Hylarana macrodactyla
Hylarana maosonensis
Hylarana menglaensis
Hylarana milleti
Hylarana nigrovittata
 Hylarana spinulosa
 Hylarana taipehensis
Japanese tree frog
Chinese flying frog
Chiromantis vittatus
Feihyla palpebralis
Gracixalus gracilipes
Gracixalus jinxiuensis
Gracixalus medogensis
Gracixalus nonggangensis
Kurixalus naso
Kurixalus odontotarsus
Kurixalus verrucosus
Raorchestes longchuanensis
Raorchestes menglaensis
Rhacophorus burmanus
Rhacophorus chenfui
Rhacophorus dorsoviridis
Rhacophorus dugritei
Rhacophorus feae
Rhacophorus hui
Rhacophorus hungfuensis
Rhacophorus kio
Rhacophorus maximus
Rhacophorus nigropunctatus
Rhacophorus omeimontis
Rhacophorus puerensis
Rhacophorus rhodopus
Rhacophorus tuberculatus
Rhacophorus yaoshanensis
Romer's tree frog
Sylvirana guentheri

Microhylidae

Calluella yunnanensis
Boreal digging frog
Kalophrynus interlineatus
Kalophrynus menglienicus
Kaloula nonggangensis
Kaloula rugifera
Kaloula verrucosa
Microhyla berdmorei
Microhyla fissipes
Microhyla heymonsi
Microhyla pulchra
Micryletta inornata
Microhyla butleri

Litter Frogs

Brachytarsophrys carinense
Brachytarsophrys feae
Brachytarsophrys popei
Buergeria oxycephala
Leptolalax alpinus
Leptolalax liui
Leptolalax oshanensis
Leptolalax sungi
Leptolalax tengchongensis
Leptolalax ventripunctatus
Megophrys binchuanensis
Megophrys brachykolos
Megophrys cheni
Megophrys huangshanensis
Megophrys lini
Megophrys major
Megophrys parva
Megophrys sangzhiensis
Megophrys shuichengensis
Megophrys wawuensis
Oreolalax chuanbeiensis
Oreolalax granulosus
Oreolalax jingdongensis
Oreolalax liangbeiensis
Oreolalax lichuanensis
Oreolalax major
Oreolalax multipunctatus
Oreolalax nanjiangensis: only in Nanjiang County, Sichuan
Oreolalax omeimontis
Oreolalax pingii
Oreolalax popei
Oreolalax puxiongensis
Oreolalax rhodostigmatus
Oreolalax rugosus
Oreolalax schmidti
Oreolalax weigoldi
Oreolalax xiangchengensis
Scutiger boulengeri
Scutiger brevipes
Scutiger chintingensis
Scutiger glandulatus
Scutiger gongshanensis
Scutiger jiulongensis
Scutiger liupanensis
Scutiger maculatus
Scutiger mammatus
Scutiger muliensis: only in Muli, Sichuan
Scutiger ningshanensis
Scutiger nyingchiensis
Scutiger pingwuensis
Scutiger sikimmensis
Scutiger tuberculatus
Scutiger wanglangensis

Shrub Frogs (Rhacophoridae)

Liuixalus hainanus
Liuixalus ocellatus
Theloderma kwangsiense: only in Dayaoshan Nature Reserve (大瑶山自然保护区), Guangxi
Philautus kempii
Polypedates impresus
Polypedates megacephalus
Polypedates mutus
Theloderma asperum
Theloderma kwangsiense
Theloderma moloch
Theloderma rhododiscus

Salt Water Frogs
China is home to one of only 144 known modern amphibians which can tolerate brief excursions into sea water.

Crab-eating frog

Toads

True Toads (Bufo) 

Ailao toad
Asiatic toad
Bufo cryptotympanicus
Bufo pageoti
Bufo tuberculatus
Bufo wolongensis: only in Wolong Nature Reserve, Sichuan
Korean water toad
Pseudepidalea pewzowi

Horned Toads (Xenophrys)

Convex-tailed horned toad
Convex-vented horned toad
Great piebald horned toad
Jingdong horned toad
Kuatun horned toad
Mangshan horned toad
Medog horned toad
Mount Dawei horned toad
Nankiang horned toad
Boettger's horned toad
 Glandular horned toad
Omei horned toad
Xenophrys daweimontis: only in Daweishan Nature Reserve (大围山自然保护区), Liuyang, Hunan
spiny-fingered horned toad
Wuliangshan horned toad
Wushan horned toad
Zhang's horned toad

Other Toads
Mongolian toad
Bombina maxima
Duttaphrynus himalayanus
Duttaphrynus melanostictus
Leptobrachium ailaonicum
Leptobrachium boringii
Leptobrachium hainanense
Leptobrachium leishanense
Leptobrachium liui
Little horned toad
Ophryophryne microstoma
Ophryophryne pachyproctus
Oriental fire-bellied toad
rough-skinned horned toad
Shaping horned toad
spiny-fingered horned toad

Salamanders and Newts 

 Amji's salamander
 Black knobby newt
 Central Asian salamander
 Chenggong fire belly newt
 Chiala mountain salamander
Chinese giant salamander (Andrias davidianus)
Chinese fire belly newt
 Chinese warty newt
 Chinhai spiny newt
 Chuxiong fire-bellied newt
Siberian salamander
Cynops wolterstorffi: only in Kunming City, Yunnan
 Dayang newt
 Fischer's clawed salamander
 Fuding fire belly newt
 Guabang Shan salamander
 Guangxi warty newt
 Guizhou salamander
Hainan knobby newt
Hong Kong warty newt
Jinfo Mountain salamander
Korean salamander
Kuankuoshui salamander
Pachyhynobius shangchengensis
Paramesotriton labiatus
Paramesotriton maolanensis
Paramesotriton yunwuensis
Puxiong salamander
Shuicheng salamander
Siberian salamander
Spot-tailed warty newt
Spotted paddle-tail newt
Taliang knobby newt
Wanggao warty newt
Wenxian knobby newt
Western Chinese mountain salamander
Xingan salamander
Yellow-spotted salamander
Yiwu salamander
Yunnan lake newt
Zhijin warty newt

Caecilians 

 Banna caecilian (Ichthyophis bannanicus)

Fish
In freshwater alone, China has more than 1,000 fish species. By far the most diverse order are the cypriniforms, followed by the siluriforms. Yangtze is the richest river basin in the country and it is home to more than 350 strict freshwater fish species (as well as several also found in brackish or saltwater). A high percentage of these are endemic to the country and many are seriously threatened. Among others, it is feared that the Chinese paddlefish, as well as several species from the Yunnan lakes (notably Dian, Erhai, Fuxian and Yilong), already are extinct. China has far more cavefish species than any other country in the world.

With a long coastline that ranges from temperate to tropical oceans, China has many marine fish species such as the Pacific cod.

Invertebrates

Freshwater crabs 
China is home to more than 250 different species of freshwater crabs (families Potamidae and Gecarcinucidae), many of them endemics. It is thus the country with the highest species richness in freshwater crabs. The most speciose genera are Sinopotamon,  Longpotamon, Indochinamon and Nanhaipotamon.

Molluscs

Butterflies

Centipedes
Ethmostigmus rubripes

Endangered species

See also

List of endangered and protected species of China
Animal welfare and rights in China
List of mammals of China
List of mammals of Taiwan
List of mammals of Hong Kong
List of amphibians of China

Notes and references

External links
China Wildlife Conservation Association

Biota of China
China